The 1972–73 season was the 58th in the history of the Isthmian League, an English football competition.

The league expanded up to 22 clubs after the Athenian League club Leatherhead was newly admitted.

Hendon were champions, winning their second Isthmian League title. It was the last Isthmian League season, consisting of a single division, as before the next season sixteen clubs joined the league and formed a new Second Division. It was also the last season in which the Isthmian League used two points for a win.

League table

References

Isthmian League seasons
I